{{DISPLAYTITLE:C19H15}}
The molecular formula C19H15 may refer to:

 Triphenylcarbenium (triphenylmethyl cation), an ion consisting of a carbon atom with a positive charge connected to three phenyl groups
 Triphenylmethyl radical, a persistent radical and the first radical ever described in organic chemistry